Tallangatta is a town in north-eastern Victoria, Australia.

History
Tallangatta was founded in the 1870s, the Post Office opening on 15 May 1871.

On the arrival of the railway it served as a rail gateway for the Mitta and Upper Murray valleys (the Upper Murray only until the railway was extended to Cudgewa).  Some gold and tin mining occurred in the late 19th and early 20th century, though, unlike Beechworth, little evidence of this remains.  The amount of gold produced was relatively small compared to other mines elsewhere in the region.

Since that time, Tallangatta has been a service centre for the local farming community, with a butter factory operating throughout much of the 20th century.

The most distinctive aspect of the town's history is that it was moved  to the west in the 1950s to a site known as Bolga to allow for the expansion of Lake Hume. Stories of the transition from old town to new town were captured in the 1988 book Slates and Suet Puddings by Carmyl Winkler. On 14 April 1955 the Post Office was renamed Tallangatta East and a new Tallangatta office opened at the new town location. The sign welcoming motorists to town reads "Tallangatta, the town that moved in the 1950s".

The grid layout of the streets of Old Tallangatta is clearly visible in Google Earth.

The Tallangatta Magistrates' Court closed on 1 January 1990.

Population
According to the 2021 Census the population of Tallangatta is 1,175, of which:

 Aboriginal and Torres Strait Islander people made up 1.9% of the population
 82.8% of people were born in Australia. 3.2% of the population were born in England, 0.9% in Malaysia, 0.7% in the United States of America, 0.6% in Scotland and 0.5% in Samoa.
 89.7% of people spoke only English at home, with the next most common language being Samoan, spoken by 1.0% of the population.
 The most common responses for religion were No Religion 40.1%, Anglican 18.2% Catholic 14.4%, and Uniting Church 5.4%.

Economy
Beef and dairy cattle farming is the dominant industry, with a small abattoir.  In 2016, Tallangatta was declared a "Notable Town", by Heritage Australia. The main street is long for a town of its size and is quite unique. The unique architecture is home to a thriving retail and hospitality sector that contributes to local employment and tourism. Services include a small hospital, and two primary schools, a secondary school and an integrated childcare, library and community centre. A considerable number of residents now commute to work in Albury–Wodonga.

The decline of the water frontage of Lake Hume, due to sporadic drought conditions and the privatisation of Australia waterways, has had an impact on the town. Although through initiatives, such as the Tallangatta Tomorrow project funded by state government, the township is experiencing a new lease on life.

There are several successful community focused initiatives operating within the township including The Hub, the Uniting Church Op Shop, Tallangatta Food Swap, Plasticwise Tallangatta, Boomerang Bags Tallangatta, and the Tallangatta Community Theatre Group.

The town has a high proportion of retirees, with some elderly people cared for at Bolga Court Hostel.  This heritage is celebrated in the popular annual Tallangatta Fifties Festival; however, as of June 2018, has ended due to financial concerns and feedback.

Transport

There is no scheduled public transport in Tallangatta, other than school buses which are not available to the general public.

The High Country Rail Trail passes through the town; it follows the route of the Cudgewa railway line, which closed in 1981.

Sport
Tallangatta has an Australian rules football team, the Tallangatta Football Club competing in the Tallangatta & District Football League.

Golfers play at the Tallangatta Golf Club on Coorilla Street.

Notable residents
 Phillip Law, scientist and Antarctic explorer was born in Tallangatta in 1912
 Doug Smith, North Melbourne footballer grew up in Tallangatta
 William Yates, a politician who served in both the British and Australian parliaments, spent his last years in Tallangatta
 Ian Trevaskis, writer and author; Children's Book Council of Australia award-winning author

References

External links

Photos of old Tallangatta at Culture Victoria

Mining towns in Victoria (Australia)
Towns in Victoria (Australia)
Shire of Towong